Gunnar Skoglund (1899–1983) was a Swedish film director, editor and screenwriter. He also acted in several films. He worked on a number of newsreels for Svensk Filmindustri.

Selected filmography
 Black Rudolf (1928)
 International Match (1932)
 Art for Art's Sake (1938)
 Woman on Board (1941)
 The Old Clock at Ronneberga (1944)
 Man's Woman (1945)
 How to Love (1947)
 The Road to Klockrike (1953)

References

Bibliography
 Hjort, Mette & Lindqvist, Ursula. A Companion to Nordic Cinema. John Wiley & Sons, 2016.

External links

1899 births
1983 deaths
Swedish film directors
Swedish film editors
Swedish screenwriters
People from Stockholm